The 2017–18 Montana State Bobcats women's basketball team represents Montana State University during the 2017–18 NCAA Division I women's basketball season. The Bobcats, led by twelfth year head coach Tricia Binford, play their home games at Brick Breeden Fieldhouse and are members of the Big Sky Conference. They finished the season 16–15, 9–9 in Big Sky play to finish in a tied seventh place. They advanced to the quarterfinals of the Big Sky women's tournament where they lost to Idaho.

Roster

Schedule

|-
!colspan=9 style="background:#; color:#c1b465;"| Exhibition

|-
!colspan=9 style="background:#; color:#c1b465;"| Non-conference regular season

|-
!colspan=9 style="background:#; color:#c1b465;"| Big Sky regular season

|-
!colspan=9 style="background:#; color:#c1b465;"| Big Sky Women's Tournament

See also
2017–18 Montana State Bobcats men's basketball team

References

Montana State Bobcats women's basketball seasons
Montana State